Margunn Haugenes (née Humlestøl; born 25 January 1970) is a Norwegian footballer. She became Olympic champion in 2000. She has won silver medals with the Norway national team, in the World Cup and in the European Championships.

Career
Haugenes debuted for the Norway women's national football team in 1990 at the age of 20, also moving from her lower-division club Kaupanger IL to the Toppserien club Asker SK. In 1994 she moved to Bergen to play for IL Sandviken, winning the Norwegian Cup competition in 1995. In 1996 she moved to Bjørnar, now Arna-Bjørnar, in the same city, contributing to the team's promotion to the Toppserien and ensuring that it became established at the top level.

Haugenes played 79 matches for the national team, gaining the runner-up place in both the World Cup and the European Cup in 1991.  She missed the 1999 season due to pregnancy, but she and the team then won Gold at the 2000 Summer Olympics in Sydney.

Following the Sydney Olympics Haugenes had two seasons at the English club Fulham, and on 6 May 2002 she was in the team that beat Doncaster Belles to win the FA Women's Cup.  In 2003, she returned to Norway to play for Amazon Grimstad and eventually retired from football at the end of 2007 after 18 months as player/trainer for the same club.

But Haugenes then started playing again for Amazon Grimstad in 2010 when her husband Gaute Haugenes, former trainer at Fulham, took over as the club's chief trainer.  In September 2011 she was still playing as a midfielder in the Toppserien at the age of 41.

Haugenes works as a teacher and as a TV commentator, and is the assistant trainer of Norway's Under-19 girls' team.  She has two children.  In 2014, she made another playing comeback with a lower division men's team IL Sørfjell.
In 2017 Haugenes was forced to make comeback again because the team that she is coach did not have enough players in the game against Vålerenga.

Honours

Fulham
FA Women's Premier League National Division: 2002–03
FA Women's Cup: 2002, 2003
FA Women's Premier League Cup: 2001–02

References

External links
 
 
 
  
 
 

1970 births
Living people
Norwegian women's footballers
Norway women's international footballers
Arna-Bjørnar players
Fulham L.F.C. players
Footballers at the 2000 Summer Olympics
Olympic footballers of Norway
Olympic gold medalists for Norway
Olympic medalists in football
1991 FIFA Women's World Cup players
FA Women's National League players
Toppserien players
Norwegian expatriate women's footballers
Expatriate women's footballers in England
Norwegian expatriate sportspeople in England
SK Brann Kvinner players
Asker Fotball (women) players
Amazon Grimstad players
People from Flora, Norway
Medalists at the 2000 Summer Olympics
Women's association football midfielders
Medkila IL (women) players
Norwegian women's football managers
Sportspeople from Vestland